Phenoxypropazine (trade name Drazine) is an irreversible and non-selective monoamine oxidase inhibitor (MAOI) of the hydrazine family. It was introduced as an antidepressant in 1961, but was subsequently withdrawn in 1966 due to hepatotoxicity concerns.

See also
 Hydrazine (antidepressant)

References

Hepatotoxins
Hydrazines
Monoamine oxidase inhibitors
Phenol ethers
Withdrawn drugs